St. George's Church in Drohobych is one of the oldest and best preserved timber churches of Galicia. The church is a monument of Galician wooden architecture of the late 15th – early 16th centuries, one of the best preserved and one of the best monuments of ancient Ukrainian sacral architecture. Built in the 15th century, it has been rebuilt several times and given the final architectural forms by the talented Ukrainian architect Hryhoriy Tesla from Drohobych. The church is part of the wooden architecture department of the Museum of Drohobych region.

The church consists of three parts. The central block is square in plan and comprises the nave. Two other blocks contain the double apse and the narthex. Between 1678 and 1711, the church was renovated: the interior was frescoed, the octagonal structures built up, and a new belfry appeared.

It is one of the 16 churches that comprise a World Heritage Site named the Wooden tserkvas of the Carpathian region in Poland and Ukraine.

See also

 Wooden Churches of Ukraine
 Saint George: Devotions, traditions and prayers

References

Sources
 Памятники градостроительства и архитектуры Украинской ССР. Киев: Будивельник, 1983–1986. Том 3, с. 98.
 Lev Skop. St. George's Church. Drohobych, 2012.

Drohobych
Buildings and structures in Lviv Oblast
Eastern Orthodox church buildings in Ukraine
Tourist attractions in Lviv Oblast
Wooden tserkvas of Carpathian region in Poland and Ukraine
16th-century churches